Jerome "Jerry" White (born 1959) is an American politician and journalist, and is the Labor Editor reporting for the World Socialist Web Site. He is a member of the Socialist Equality Party of the United States, and was a member of its predecessor the Workers League, joining the movement in 1979. White was the SEP's nominee for the United States presidential elections four times, running in 1996, 2008, 2012 and 2016.

Early life
Jerome White was raised in a working-class family in Queens, New York. In 1979, while working at United Parcel Service and attending the City University of New York, he joined the Workers League, the predecessor of the Socialist Equality Party.

Career
As a reporter for the World Socialist Web Site, White has written extensively on the US auto industry, and has interviewed autoworkers in Michigan, Indiana, Ohio, and Illinois. White authored a book, published in 1990, entitled Death on the Picket Line: The Story of John McCoy. The book, an investigative report, treats the killing of a militant coal miner, McCoy, as well as the history of the United Mine Workers (UMW) in West Virginia.

White has been active in Detroit's Committee Against Utility Shutoffs (CAUS) and organized hearings on fires in low income neighborhoods. He has criticized the Obama Administration for what he has described as its policies favoring Wall Street at the expense of workers.

White is the Editor of the World Socialist Web Site Autoworkers Newsletter. White announced the creation of the WSWS Autoworker Newsletter in July 2015, as a means to oppose to "UAW Nationalism", pension cuts, poverty wages, and unemployment, and to call for the abolishment of the two-tier wage system, and develop an international unity among autoworkers. The Autoworkers Newsletter played a substantial role in the "No vote" carried out by Fiat Chrysler workers and Nexteer workers in 2015 against the proposed contract.

Election campaigns
In 1996, White ran as the first presidential candidate for the newly-formed Socialist Equality Party (SEP) with vice-presidential candidate Fred Mazelis.

In 2006, White ran for Michigan's 112th Congressional district seat as an SEP candidate.

In 2008, White ran as the SEP presidential candidate with vice-presidential candidate Bill Van Auken. The write-in campaign was accompanied by a redesign of the Socialist Equality Party's website, which would rehost articles written by both candidates for the World Socialist Web Site.

In 2012, White ran as the SEP presidential candidate with vice-presidential candidate Phyllis Scherrer. The campaign was announced from the Cooper Tire factories in Findley, Ohio, where workers were locked out for contesting contract negotiations. The White-Scherrer ticket was on the ballot in Wisconsin, Louisiana, and had write-in status for Michigan. White visited Canada, Germany, England and Sri Lanka to campaign for socialism and an international working-class movement.

White's 2012 presidential campaign kept five core components: social equality, international unity in the working class,  rejection of austerity, opposition to imperialist militarism and the assault on democratic rights, and opposition to the political subordination of the working class to the Democrats and Republicans. White's campaign indicted the crisis that arose from the 2008 global financial crash as evidence of the failure of capitalism to organize society in a productive manner, and called for the building of an independent socialist movement and called for social rights to housing, retirement, food, and education.

In 2016, White ran as the SEP presidential candidate with vice-presidential candidate Niles Niemuth.

References

External links
 World Socialist Web Site
 Socialist Equality Party
 Jerome White

1959 births
Living people
People from Queens, New York
Socialist Equality Party (United States) politicians
Candidates in the 2016 United States presidential election
Candidates in the 2012 United States presidential election
21st-century American politicians
Michigan politicians
Candidates in the 2008 United States presidential election
Candidates in the 1996 United States presidential election
20th-century American politicians